Grayrigg is a small village and civil parish in the South Lakeland district of Cumbria, England. In the 2001 census the parish had a population of 223, increasing at the 2011 census to 242.

History
Historically a part of Westmorland, Grayrigg and its surrounding area have provided evidence of an ancient Roman camp. During the Middle Ages Grayrigg formed a chapelry and township centred on the chapel dedicated to St John the Evangelist, which is still in use.

Railway accidents
Grayrigg's 20th and 21st century history is marked by two high-profile major train crashes.

On 18 May 1947, a 13-carriage London Midland & Scottish Railway service from  Glasgow Central to London Euston failed to stop at the signals for Lambrigg Crossing and collided with a locomotive with 33 people injured, three seriously.

On 23 February 2007, Lambrigg Crossovers (54.358507,-2.655958), south of Grayrigg was the site of the Grayrigg derailment, a fatal derailment involving a Virgin Trains West Coast service from London Euston to Glasgow Central.

See also

 Listed buildings in Grayrigg
 Grayrigg Forest

References

External links
  Cumbria County History Trust: Grayrigg (nb: provisional research only - see Talk page)

Villages in Cumbria
Westmorland
Civil parishes in Cumbria